The Butler Medal, also known as the Colored Troops Medal, was a military decoration of a unit of the United States Army which was issued in 1865. The medal was commissioned by Major General Benjamin Butler and was intended to recognize meritorious or heroic acts of bravery performed by African American soldiers at the Battle of Chaffin's Farm and New Market Heights. Fourteen African Americans had earned the Medal of Honor in that engagement, but Butler wished to further recognize his African American troops involved in the battle, and he paid for the Butler Medals out of his personal funds.

In May 1865, and later that year, the Butler Medal was presented to nearly two hundred African American Union soldiers. The medal was originally known as the Colored Troops Medal, but the name was changed to Butler Medal after the close of the Civil War.

The Butler Medal was solid silver, suspended from a red, white, and blue ribbon meant to be worn around the neck. Attached to the ribbon was a wreath reading "Army of the James". The front of the medal depicts African American troops moving forward in battle, below an inscription in Latin which reads, Ferro iis libertas perveniet: "Freedom Will be Theirs by the Sword."

The obverse of the medal has a curved inscription that says, in capital letters:

After the war, Butler said the following about the medal:

References

Awards and decorations of the United States Army
Military history of African Americans in the American Civil War
Awards established in 1864
Military awards and decorations of the American Civil War
United States campaign medals
Awards honoring African Americans